Páll Logason (born 31 January 1986), also known as 'Fermeter' (Square-meter in English), is an Icelandic powerlifter and a strongman from Garðabær.

Career
Páll was passionate about lifting heavy weights since his teenage years and trained together with the likes of Stefán Sölvi Pétursson, Benedikt Magnússon and a young Hafþór Júlíus Björnsson at the 'Strongman Base' gym. 

He entered his first powerlifting competition in 2007. At the 2008 World Powerlifting Federation – World Championships in Austria, he totaled 1,000 kg (single ply equipment) and won the Juniors (20–23) category; and the following year at the 2009 World Powerlifting Federation – World Championships in the United States, he improved his total to 1,035 kg and again won the Juniors (20–23) category. At the 2012 IKF Icelandic Cup, he totaled 1,025 kg (raw) with a 400 kg squat, 250 kg bench press, 375 kg deadlift and a 551.7 Dots score. From 2008 to 2012, Páll won a total of 13 powerlifting competitions.  

As a strongman, Páll emerged 3rd place in the 2011 Jón Páll Sigmarsson Classic. He is also a regular entrant to the Iceland's Strongest Man competition and a 6 time podium finisher, emerging the runner up twice behind Hafþór Júlíus Björnsson in 2013 and 2014. 

Páll graduated from the University of Iceland and works at Smith og Norland, Reykjavik.

Personal records
Squat –  (Raw)
Bench Press –  (Equipped),  (Raw)
Deadlift –  (Raw)
Hummer Tyre Deadlift (from 15") – 442 kg (975 lb) (Raw)
Log press – 
Axel press – 
One arm weight over bar –  over 16 ft 6 in

References

1986 births
Living people
Icelandic strength athletes
University of Iceland alumni
People from Garðabær